The Huerfano County Courthouse and  old Walsenburg jail now the Walsenburg Mining Museum, are historic buildings in Walsenburg, Colorado in Huerfano County. The courthouse was built in 1904. The jail was built in 1896. The buildings were added to the National Register of Historic Places on April 23, 1973. The courthouse is located at 400 Main Street. The jail is located at 112 West Fifth Street. The jail held Bob Ford, who killed Jesse James, and labor leader Mary "Mother" Jones.

See also
National Register of Historic Places listings in Colorado

References

External links

Walsenburg Mining Museum website Huerfano County Historical Society

Buildings and structures in Huerfano County, Colorado
Courthouses on the National Register of Historic Places in Colorado
County courthouses in Colorado
Government buildings completed in 1904
Romanesque architecture
Museums in Huerfano County, Colorado
National Register of Historic Places in Huerfano County, Colorado
Mining museums in Colorado
1904 establishments in Colorado